Rembrandt Harmenszoon van Rijn (15 July 1606 – 4 October 1669), usually simply known as Rembrandt, was a Dutch Golden Age painter, printmaker and draughtsman. An innovative and prolific master in three media, he is generally considered one of the greatest visual artists in the history of art and the most important in Dutch art history. It is estimated Rembrandt produced a total of about three hundred paintings, three hundred etchings and two thousand drawings.

Unlike most Dutch masters of the 17th century, Rembrandt's works depict a wide range of styles and subject matter, from portraits and self-portraits to landscapes, genre scenes, allegorical and historical scenes, biblical and mythological themes and animal studies. His contributions to art came in a period of great wealth and cultural achievement that historians call the Dutch Golden Age, when Dutch art (especially Dutch painting), whilst antithetical to the Baroque style that dominated Europe, was prolific and innovative. This era gave rise to important new genres. Like many artists of the Dutch Golden Age, such as Jan Vermeer, Rembrandt was an avid art collector and dealer.

Rembrandt never went abroad but was considerably influenced by the work of the Italian masters and Dutch artists who had studied in Italy, like Pieter Lastman, the Utrecht Caravaggists,  and Peter Paul Rubens. After he achieved youthful success as a portrait painter, Rembrandt's later years were marked by personal tragedy and financial hardships. Yet his etchings and paintings were popular throughout his lifetime, his reputation as an artist remained high, and for twenty years he taught many important Dutch painters.

Rembrandt's portraits of his contemporaries, self-portraits and illustrations of scenes from the Bible are regarded as his greatest creative triumphs. His 40 self-portraits form an intimate autobiography. Rembrandt's foremost contribution in the history of printmaking was his transformation of the etching process from a relatively new reproductive technique into an art form. His reputation as the greatest etcher in the history of the medium was established in his lifetime. Few of his paintings left the Dutch Republic while he lived but his prints were circulated throughout Europe, and his wider reputation was initially based on them alone.

In his works, he exhibited knowledge of classical iconography. A depiction of a biblical scene was informed by Rembrandt's knowledge of the specific text, his assimilation of classical composition, and his observations of Amsterdam's Jewish population. Because of his empathy for the human condition, he has been called "one of the great prophets of civilization". The French sculptor Auguste Rodin said, "Compare me with Rembrandt! What sacrilege! With Rembrandt, the colossus of Art! We should prostrate ourselves before Rembrandt and never compare anyone with him!"

Early life and education

Rembrandt Harmenszoon van Rijn was born on 15 July 1606 in Leiden, in the Dutch Republic, now the Netherlands. He was the ninth child born to Harmen Gerritszoon van Rijn and Neeltgen Willemsdochter van Zuijtbrouck. His family was quite well-to-do; his father was a miller and his mother was a baker's daughter. His mother was Catholic, and his father belonged to the Dutch Reformed Church. Religion is a central theme in Rembrandt's works and the religiously fraught period in which he lived makes his faith a matter of interest. 

As a boy, he attended a Latin school. At the age of 13, he was enrolled at the University of Leiden, although according to a contemporary he had a greater inclination towards painting; he was soon apprenticed to Jacob van Swanenburg, with whom he spent three years. After a brief but important apprenticeship of six months with the history painter Pieter Lastman in Amsterdam, Rembrandt stayed a few months with Jacob Pynas and then started his own workshop, though Simon van Leeuwen claimed that Joris van Schooten taught Rembrandt in Leiden. Unlike many of his contemporaries who traveled to Italy as part of their artistic training, Rembrandt never left the Dutch Republic during his lifetime.

Career

In 1624 or 1625, Rembrandt opened a studio in Leiden, which he shared with friend and colleague Jan Lievens. In 1627, Rembrandt began to accept students, which included Gerrit Dou in 1628 and Isaac de Jouderville.
In 1629, Rembrandt was discovered by the statesman Constantijn Huygens who procured for Rembrandt important commissions from the court of The Hague. As a result of this connection, Prince Frederik Hendrik continued to purchase paintings from Rembrandt until 1646.

At the end of 1631, Rembrandt moved to Amsterdam, a city rapidly expanding as the business and trade capital. He began to practice as a professional portraitist for the first time, with great success. He initially stayed with an art dealer, Hendrick van Uylenburgh, and in 1634, married Hendrick's cousin, Saskia van Uylenburgh. Saskia (or Sasha) came from a respected family: her father Rombertus was a lawyer and had been burgomaster (mayor) of Leeuwarden.  The couple married in the local church of St. Annaparochie without the presence of Rembrandt's relatives. In the same year, Rembrandt became a citizen of Amsterdam and a member of the local guild of painters. He also acquired a number of students, among them Ferdinand Bol and Govert Flinck.

In 1635, Rembrandt and Saskia rented a fashionable lodging with a view of the river. In 1639 they moved to a large and recently modernized house in the upscale 'Breestraat' with artists and art dealers; Nicolaes Pickenoy, a portrait painter was his neighbor. 
The mortgage to finance the 13,000 guilder purchase would be a cause for later financial difficulties. The neighborhood sheltered many immigrants and was becoming the Jewish quarter. It was there that Rembrandt frequently sought his Jewish neighbors to model for his Old Testament scenes. 

Although they were by now affluent, the couple suffered several personal setbacks; their son Rumbartus died two months after his birth  and their daughter Cornelia died at just three weeks of age.  A second daughter, also named Cornelia, died after living barely over a month. Only their fourth child, Titus, who was born in 1641, survived into adulthood.  Five of his children were christened in Dutch Reformed churches in Amsterdam: four in the Old Church and one, Titus, in the Southern Church.

Saskia died in 1642, probably from tuberculosis. Rembrandt's drawings of her on her sick and death bed are among his most moving works.

During Saskia's illness, Geertje Dircx was hired as Titus' caretaker and dry nurse; at some time she also became Rembrandt's lover. In 1649 she left and charged Rembrandt with breach of promise (a euphemism for seduction under [breached] promise to marry) and be awarded alimony. Rembrandt tried to settle the matter amicably but she pawned the ring he had given her that once belonged to Saskia to maintain her livelihood. The court particularly stated that Rembrandt had to pay a maintenance allowance, provided that Titus remained her only heir and she sold none of Rembrandt's possessions. In 1650 Rembrandt paid for the travel costs to have her committed to an asylum or almshouse at Gouda. Five years later he didn't support her release.  In August 1656 Geertje was listed as one of Rembrandt's seven major creditors. 

In early 1649 Rembrandt began a relationship with the much younger Hendrickje Stoffels, who had initially been his maid. She may have been the cause that Geertje left. In July 1654 she was pregnant, and received a summons from the Reformed Church to answer the charge "that she had committed the acts of a whore with Rembrandt the painter". She admitted and was banned from receiving communion. Rembrandt was not summoned to appear for the Church council; while his work reveals deep Christian faith, there is no evidence that Rembrandt formally belonged to any church. In October they had a daughter, Cornelia but Rembrandt had not married Hendrickje. Had he remarried he would have lost access to a trust set up for Titus in Saskia's will.

Insolvency

 

Rembrandt lived beyond his means, buying art,  prints  and rarities. In January 1653 the sale of the property formally closed  but Rembrandt still had to pay half of the mortgage. The creditors began to insist on installments but Rembrandt refused and asked for a postponement. The  house had to be repaired and Rembrandt borrowed money from his friend Jan Six among others.  In 1655 the 14-years-old Titus made a will, making his father sole heir, shutting out his mother’s family. After a notorious year with plague, (art) business dropped and Rembrandt applied for a high court arrangement (cessio bonorum). In 1656 he declared his insolvency, taking stock and voluntarily surrendered his goods. Meanwhile, he had donated the house to his son.   The authorities and his creditors were generally accommodating to him, giving him plenty of time to pay his debts. In November 1657 an auction was organized to sell his paintings and a large number of etching plates, drawings (some by Raphael, Mantegna and Giorgione). Rembrandt was allowed to keep all his tools  as a mean of income.  

The sale list with 363 items gives a good insight into Rembrandt's collections, which, apart from Old Master paintings and drawings, included statues and busts of the Roman emperors and Greek philosophers, twenty books (a bible), two globes, bonnets, armor (helmets, bows and arrows), chinaware, among many objects from Asia, a collections of natural history (two lion skins, a bird-of-paradise), corals and minerals. The prices realized in the sale were disappointing. In February 1658 Rembrandt' house was sold at a (foreclosure) auction and the family quickly moved to more modest accommodation at Rozengracht; Hendrickje complained at the authorities as she left an oak cupboard.  Early December 1660 the sale of the house was closed but the money went straight to Titus' guardian. 

Two weeks later Hendrickje and Titus set up a dummy corporation as art dealers, so Rembrandt, who had board and lodging, could continue to produce. In 1661, the business was contracted to complete work for the recently finished town hall. The resulting work, The Conspiracy of Claudius Civilis, was rejected by the mayors and returned to the painter within a few weeks; the surviving fragment (in Stockholm)  is only a quarter of the original.  In 1662 he was still fulfilling major commissions for portraits and finished the Sampling Officials. Around this time Rembrandt took on his last apprentice, Aert de Gelder. It is problematic how wealthy Rembrandt was and he overestimated the value of his art collection.  Anyhow, half was earmarked for Titus' inheritance. 

In March 1663 Hendrickje was sick and Titus was allowed to act. Isaac van Hertsbeeck, Rembrandt's main creditor, went to the High Court to contest that Titus had to be paid first.  He lost more than once and had to pay  the money he had already received to Titus in 1665 who was by then declared of age. Rembrandt was working on the Jewish Bride and his three final self-portraits but fell into rent arrears. Cosimo III de' Medici, Grand Duke of Tuscany visited Rembrandt twice and travelled back to Florence with one of the self-portraits.

Rembrandt outlived both Hendrickje and Titus, who died in September 1668, leaving a pregnant widow behind.  Rembrandt died on Friday 4 October 1669; he was buried four days later in a rented grave in the Westerkerk. Supposedly as a rich man as the heirs paid in burial taxes a substantial amount of money, f 15.   Cornelia (1654-1684), his illegitimate child, moved to Batavia in 1670 with an obscure painter  and the inheritance of her mother. His only grandchild, Titia  (1669-1715), inherited a considerable sum  from Titus. According to Bob Wessels: With more than 20 legal conflicts and disputes, in all areas of life and business, Rembrandt also led a turbulent legal and financial life.

Works

In a letter to Huygens, Rembrandt offered the only surviving explanation of what he sought to achieve through his art, writing that, "the greatest and most natural movement", translated from de meeste en de natuurlijkste beweegelijkheid. The word "beweegelijkheid" translates to "emotion" or "motive". Whether this refers to objectives, material, or something else, is not known but critics have drawn particular attention to the way Rembrandt seamlessly melded the earthly and spiritual.

Earlier 20th century connoisseurs claimed Rembrandt had produced well over 600 paintings, nearly 400 etchings and 2,000 drawings. More recent scholarship, from the 1960s to the present day (led by the Rembrandt Research Project), often controversially, has winnowed his oeuvre to nearer 300 paintings. His prints, traditionally all called etchings, although many are produced in whole or part by engraving and sometimes drypoint, have a much more stable total of slightly under 300. It is likely Rembrandt made many more drawings in his lifetime than 2,000 but those extant are more rare than presumed. Two experts claim that the number of drawings whose autograph status can be regarded as effectively "certain" is no higher than about 75, although this is disputed. The list was to be unveiled at a scholarly meeting in February 2010.

At one time, approximately 90 paintings were counted as Rembrandt self-portraits but it is now known that he had his students copy his own self-portraits as part of their training. Modern scholarship has reduced the autograph count to over forty paintings, as well as a few drawings and thirty-one etchings, which include many of the most remarkable images of the group. Some show him posing in quasi-historical fancy dress, or pulling faces at himself. His oil paintings trace the progress from an uncertain young man, through the dapper and very successful portrait-painter of the 1630s, to the troubled but massively powerful portraits of his old age. Together they give a remarkably clear picture of the man, his appearance and his psychological make-up, as revealed by his richly weathered face.

In his portraits and self-portraits, he angles the sitter's face in such a way that the ridge of the nose nearly always forms the line of demarcation between brightly illuminated and shadowy areas. A Rembrandt face is a face partially eclipsed; and the nose, bright and obvious, thrusting into the riddle of halftones, serves to focus the viewer's attention upon, and to dramatize, the division between a flood of light—an overwhelming clarity—and a brooding duskiness.

In a number of biblical works, including The Raising of the Cross, Joseph Telling His Dreams, and The Stoning of Saint Stephen, Rembrandt painted himself as a character in the crowd. Durham suggests that this was because the Bible was for Rembrandt "a kind of diary, an account of moments in his own life".

Among the more prominent characteristics of Rembrandt's work are his use of chiaroscuro, the theatrical employment of light and shadow derived from Caravaggio, or, more likely, from the Dutch Caravaggisti but adapted for very personal means. Also notable are his dramatic and lively presentation of subjects, devoid of the rigid formality that his contemporaries often displayed, and a deeply felt compassion for mankind, irrespective of wealth and age. His immediate family—his wife Saskia, his son Titus and his common-law wife Hendrickje—often figured prominently in his paintings, many of which had mythical, biblical or historical themes.

Periods, themes and styles

Throughout his career, Rembrandt took as his primary subjects the themes of portraiture, landscape and narrative painting. For the last, he was especially praised by his contemporaries, who extolled him as a masterly interpreter of biblical stories for his skill in representing emotions and attention to detail. Stylistically, his paintings progressed from the early "smooth" manner, characterized by fine technique in the portrayal of illusionistic form, to the late "rough" treatment of richly variegated paint surfaces, which allowed for an illusionism of form suggested by the tactile quality of the paint itself. Rembrandt must have realized that if he kept the paint deliberately loose and "paint-like" on some parts of the canvas, the perception of space became much greater. 

A parallel development may be seen in Rembrandt's skill as a printmaker. In the etchings of his maturity, particularly from the late 1640s onward, the freedom and breadth of his drawings and paintings found expression in the print medium as well. The works encompass a wide range of subject matter and technique, sometimes leaving large areas of white paper to suggest space, at other times employing complex webs of line to produce rich dark tones.

Lastman's influence on Rembrandt was most prominent during his period in Leiden from 1625 to 1631. Paintings were rather small but rich in details (for example, in costumes and jewelry). Religious and allegorical themes were favored, as were tronies. In 1626 Rembrandt produced his first etchings, the wide dissemination of which would largely account for his international fame. In 1629 he completed Judas Repentant, Returning the Pieces of Silver and The Artist in His Studio, works that evidence his interest in the handling of light and variety of paint application, and constitute the first major progress in his development as a painter.

During his early years in Amsterdam (1632–1636), Rembrandt began to paint dramatic biblical and mythological scenes in high contrast and of large format (The Blinding of Samson, 1636, Belshazzar's Feast, c. 1635 Danaë, 1636 but reworked later), seeking to emulate the baroque style of Rubens. With the occasional help of assistants in Uylenburgh's workshop, he painted numerous portrait commissions both small (Jacob de Gheyn III) and large (Portrait of the Shipbuilder Jan Rijcksen and his Wife, 1633, Anatomy Lesson of Dr. Nicolaes Tulp, 1632).

By the late 1630s, Rembrandt had produced a few paintings and many etchings of landscapes. Often these landscapes highlighted natural drama, featuring uprooted trees and ominous skies (Cottages before a Stormy Sky, c. 1641; The Three Trees, 1643). From 1640 his work became less exuberant and more sober in tone, possibly reflecting personal tragedy. Biblical scenes were now derived more often from the New Testament than the Old Testament, as had been the case before. In 1642 he painted The Night Watch, the most substantial of the important group portrait commissions which he received in this period, and through which he sought to find solutions to compositional and narrative problems that had been attempted in previous works.

In the decade following the Night Watch, Rembrandt's paintings varied greatly in size, subject, and style. The previous tendency to create dramatic effects primarily by strong contrasts of light and shadow gave way to the use of frontal lighting and larger and more saturated areas of color. Simultaneously, figures came to be placed parallel to the picture plane. These changes can be seen as a move toward a classical mode of composition and, considering the more expressive use of brushwork as well, may indicate a familiarity with Venetian art (Susanna and the Elders, 1637–47).
At the same time, there was a marked decrease in painted works in favor of etchings and drawings of landscapes. In these graphic works natural drama eventually made way for quiet Dutch rural scenes.

In the 1650s, Rembrandt's style changed again. Colors became richer and brush strokes more pronounced. With these changes, Rembrandt distanced himself from earlier work and current fashion, which increasingly inclined toward fine, detailed works. His use of light becomes more jagged and harsh, and shine becomes almost nonexistent. His singular approach to paint application may have been suggested in part by familiarity with the work of Titian, and could be seen in the context of the then current discussion of 'finish' and surface quality of paintings. Contemporary accounts sometimes remark disapprovingly of the coarseness of Rembrandt's brushwork, and the artist himself was said to have dissuaded visitors from looking too closely at his paintings. The tactile manipulation of paint may hearken to medieval procedures, when mimetic effects of rendering informed a painting's surface. The result is a richly varied handling of paint, deeply layered and often apparently haphazard, which suggests form and space in both an illusory and highly individual manner.

In later years, biblical themes were often depicted but emphasis shifted from dramatic group scenes to intimate portrait-like figures (James the Apostle, 1661). In his last years, Rembrandt painted his most deeply reflective self-portraits (from 1652 to 1669 he painted fifteen), and several moving images of both men and women (The Jewish Bride, c. 1666)—in love, in life, and before God.

Graphic works

Rembrandt produced etchings for most of his career, from 1626 to 1660, when he was forced to sell his printing-press and practically abandoned etching. Only the troubled year of 1649 produced no dated work. He took easily to etching and, though he learned to use a burin and partly engraved many plates, the freedom of etching technique was fundamental to his work. He was very closely involved in the whole process of printmaking, and must have printed at least early examples of his etchings himself. At first he used a style based on drawing but soon moved to one based on painting, using a mass of lines and numerous bitings with the acid to achieve different strengths of line. Towards the end of the 1630s, he reacted against this manner and moved to a simpler style, with fewer bitings. He worked on the so-called Hundred Guilder Print in stages throughout the 1640s, and it was the "critical work in the middle of his career", from which his final etching style began to emerge.
Although the print only survives in two states, the first very rare, evidence of much reworking can be seen underneath the final print and many drawings survive for elements of it.

In the mature works of the 1650s, Rembrandt was more ready to improvise on the plate and large prints typically survive in several states, up to eleven, often radically changed. He now used hatching to create his dark areas, which often take up much of the plate. He also experimented with the effects of printing on different kinds of paper, including Japanese paper, which he used frequently, and on vellum. He began to use "surface tone," leaving a thin film of ink on parts of the plate instead of wiping it completely clean to print each impression. He made more use of drypoint, exploiting, especially in landscapes, the rich fuzzy burr that this technique gives to the first few impressions.

His prints have similar subjects to his paintings, although the 27 self-portraits are relatively more common, and portraits of other people less so. There are forty-six landscapes, mostly small, which largely set the course for the graphic treatment of landscape until the end of the 19th century. One third of his etchings are of religious subjects, many treated with a homely simplicity, whilst others are his most monumental prints. A few erotic, or just obscene, compositions have no equivalent in his paintings. He owned, until forced to sell it, a magnificent collection of prints by other artists, and many borrowings and influences in his work can be traced to artists as diverse as Mantegna, Raphael, Hercules Seghers, and Giovanni Benedetto Castiglione.

Drawings by Rembrandt and his pupils/followers have been extensively studied by many artists and scholars through the centuries. His original draughtsmanship has been described as an individualistic art style that was very similar to East Asian old masters, most notably Chinese masters: a "combination of formal clarity and calligraphic vitality in the movement of pen or brush that is closer to Chinese painting in technique and feeling than to anything in European art before the twentieth century".

Asian inspiration

Rembrandt was interested in Mughal miniatures, especially around the 1650s. He drew versions of some 23 Mughal paintings, and may have owned an album of them. These miniatures include paintings of Shah Jahan, Akbar, Jahangir and Dara Shikoh and may have influenced the costumes and other aspects of his works.

The Night Watch

Rembrandt painted The Militia Company of Captain Frans Banning Cocq between 1640 and 1642, which became his most famous work. This picture was called De Nachtwacht by the Dutch and The Night Watch by Sir Joshua Reynolds because by 1781 the picture was so dimmed and defaced that it was almost indistinguishable, and it looked quite like a night scene. After it was cleaned, it was discovered to represent broad day—a party of 18 musketeers stepping from a gloomy courtyard into the blinding sunlight. For Théophile Thoré it was the prettiest painting in the world. 

The piece was commissioned for the new hall of the Kloveniersdoelen, the musketeer branch of the civic militia. Rembrandt departed from convention, which ordered that such genre pieces should be stately and formal, rather a line-up than an action scene. Instead he showed the militia readying themselves to embark on a mission, though the exact nature of the mission or event is a matter of ongoing debate.

Contrary to what is often said, the work was hailed as a success from the beginning. Parts of the canvas were cut off (approximately 20% from the left hand side was removed) to make the painting fit its new position when it was moved to Amsterdam town hall in 1715. In 1817 this large painting was moved to the Trippenhuis. Since 1885 the painting is on display at the Rijksmuseum. In 1940 the painting was moved to Kasteel Radboud; in 1941 to a bunker near Heemskerk; in 1942 to St Pietersberg; in June 1945 it was shipped back to Amsterdam.

Expert assessments

In 1968, the Rembrandt Research Project began under the sponsorship of the Netherlands Organization for the Advancement of Scientific Research; it was initially expected to last a highly optimistic ten years. Art historians teamed up with experts from other fields to reassess the authenticity of works attributed to Rembrandt, using all methods available, including state-of-the-art technical diagnostics, and to compile a complete new catalogue raisonné of his paintings. As a result of their findings, many paintings that were previously attributed to Rembrandt have been removed from their list, although others have been added back. Many of those removed are now thought to be the work of his students.

One example of activity is The Polish Rider, now housed in the Frick Collection in New York City. Rembrandt's authorship had been questioned by at least one scholar, Alfred von Wurzbach, at the beginning of the twentieth century but for many decades later most scholars, including the foremost authority writing in English, Julius S. Held, agreed that it was indeed by the master. In the 1980s, however, Dr. Josua Bruyn of the Foundation Rembrandt Research Project cautiously and tentatively attributed the painting to one of Rembrandt's closest and most talented pupils, Willem Drost, about whom little is known. But Bruyn's remained a minority opinion, the suggestion of Drost's authorship is now generally rejected, and the Frick itself never changed its own attribution, the label still reading "Rembrandt" and not "attributed to" or "school of". More recent opinion has shifted even more decisively in favor of the Frick; In his 1999 book Rembrandt's Eyes, Simon Schama and the Rembrandt Project scholar Ernst van de Wetering (Melbourne Symposium, 1997) both argued for attribution to the master. Those few scholars who still question Rembrandt's authorship feel that the execution is uneven, and favour different attributions for different parts of the work.

A similar issue was raised by Schama concerning the verification of titles associated with the subject matter depicted in Rembrandt's works. For example, the exact subject being portrayed in Aristotle with a Bust of Homer, recently retitled by curators at the Metropolitan Museum, has been directly challenged by Schama applying the scholarship of Paul Crenshaw. Schama presents a substantial argument that it was the famous ancient Greek painter Apelles who is depicted in contemplation by Rembrandt and not Aristotle.

Another painting, Pilate Washing His Hands, is also of questionable attribution. Critical opinion of this picture has varied since 1905, when Wilhelm von Bode described it as "a somewhat abnormal work" by Rembrandt. Scholars have since dated the painting to the 1660s and assigned it to an anonymous pupil, possibly Aert de Gelder. The composition bears superficial resemblance to mature works by Rembrandt but lacks the master's command of illumination and modeling.

The attribution and re-attribution work is ongoing. In 2005 four oil paintings previously attributed to Rembrandt's students were reclassified as the work of Rembrandt himself: Study of an Old Man in Profile and Study of an Old Man with a Beard from a US private collection, Study of a Weeping Woman, owned by the Detroit Institute of Arts, and Portrait of an Elderly Woman in a White Bonnet, painted in 1640. The Old Man Sitting in a Chair is a further example: in 2014, Professor Ernst van de Wetering offered his view to The Guardian that the demotion of the 1652 painting Old Man Sitting in a Chair "was a vast mistake...it is a most important painting. The painting needs to be seen in terms of Rembrandt's experimentation". This was highlighted much earlier by Nigel Konstam who studied Rembrandt throughout his career.

Rembrandt's own studio practice is a major factor in the difficulty of attribution, since, like many masters before him, he encouraged his students to copy his paintings, sometimes finishing or retouching them to be sold as originals, and sometimes selling them as authorized copies. Additionally, his style proved easy enough for his most talented students to emulate. Further complicating matters is the uneven quality of some of Rembrandt's own work, and his frequent stylistic evolutions and experiments. As well, there were later imitations of his work, and restorations which so seriously damaged the original works that they are no longer recognizable. It is highly likely that there will never be universal agreement as to what does and what does not constitute a genuine Rembrandt.

Painting materials

Technical investigation of Rembrandt's paintings in the possession of the Gemäldegalerie Alte Meister and in the Gemäldegalerie Alte Meister (Kassel) was conducted by Hermann Kühn in 1977. The pigment analyses of some thirty paintings have shown that Rembrandt's palette consisted of the following pigments: lead white, various ochres, Vandyke brown, bone black, charcoal black, lamp black, vermilion, madder lake, azurite, ultramarine, yellow lake and lead-tin-yellow. One painting (Saskia van Uylenburgh as Flora) reportedly contains gamboge. Rembrandt very rarely used pure blue or green colors, the most pronounced exception being Belshazzar's Feast in the National Gallery in London. The book by Bomford describes more recent technical investigations and pigment analyses of Rembrandt's paintings predominantly in the National Gallery in London. The entire array of pigments employed by Rembrandt can be found at ColourLex. The best source for technical information on Rembrandt's paintings on the web is the Rembrandt Database containing all works of Rembrandt with detailed investigative reports, infrared and radiography images and other scientific details.

Name and signature

"Rembrandt" is a modification of the spelling of the artist's first name that he introduced in 1633. "Harmenszoon" indicates that his father's name is Harmen. "van Rijn" indicates that his family lived near the Rhine.

Rembrandt's earliest signatures (c. 1625) consisted of an initial "R", or the monogram "RH" (for Rembrant Harmenszoon), and starting in 1629, "RHL" (the "L" stood, presumably, for Leiden). In 1632, he used this monogram early in the year, then added his family name to it, "RHL-van Rijn" but replaced this form in that same year and began using his first name alone with its original spelling, "Rembrant". In 1633 he added a "d", and maintained this form consistently from then on, proving that this minor change had a meaning for him (whatever it might have been). This change is purely visual; it does not change the way his name is pronounced. Curiously enough, despite the large number of paintings and etchings signed with this modified first name, most of the documents that mentioned him during his lifetime retained the original "Rembrant" spelling. (Note: the rough chronology of signature forms above applies to the paintings, and to a lesser degree to the etchings; from 1632, presumably, there is only one etching signed "RHL-v. Rijn," the large-format "Raising of Lazarus," B 73). His practice of signing his work with his first name, later followed by Vincent van Gogh, was probably inspired by Raphael, Leonardo da Vinci and Michelangelo who, then as now, were referred to by their first names alone.

Workshop

Rembrandt ran a large workshop and had many pupils. The list of Rembrandt pupils from his period in Leiden as well as his time in Amsterdam is quite long, mostly because his influence on painters around him was so great that it is difficult to tell whether someone worked for him in his studio or just copied his style for patrons eager to acquire a Rembrandt. A partial list should include Ferdinand Bol,
Adriaen Brouwer,
Gerrit Dou,
Willem Drost,
Heiman Dullaart,
Gerbrand van den Eeckhout,
Carel Fabritius,
Govert Flinck,
Hendrick Fromantiou,
Aert de Gelder,
Samuel Dirksz van Hoogstraten,
Abraham Janssens,
Godfrey Kneller,
Philip de Koninck,
Jacob Levecq,
Nicolaes Maes,
Jürgen Ovens,
Christopher Paudiß,
Willem de Poorter,
Jan Victors, and
Willem van der Vliet.

Museum collections

The most notable collections of Rembrandt's work are in the United States and housed in the Metropolitan Museum of Art and Frick Collection in New York City, the National Gallery of Art in Washington, D.C., Museum of Fine Arts in Boston, and J. Paul Getty Museum in Los Angeles, in total 86 paintings. Notable collections are in Germany (69 paintings): Gemäldegalerie in Berlin, Gemäldegalerie Alte Meister in Dresden, and Schloss Wilhelmshöhe in Kassel; 51 are in the UK and  49 in the Netherlands, at Amsterdam's Rijksmuseum,  the Mauritshuis in The Hague. Others can be found in The Louvre, the Hermitage Museum, and Nationalmuseum, Stockholm. The Royal Castle in Warsaw displays two paintings by Rembrandt.

The Rembrandt House Museum has furnishings that are mostly not original but period pieces comparable to those Rembrandt might have had, and paintings reflecting Rembrandt's use of the house for art dealing. His printmaking studio has been set up with a printing press, where replica prints are printed. The museum has a few Rembrandt paintings, many loaned but an important collection of his prints, a good selection of which are on rotating display. All major print rooms have large collections of Rembrandt prints, although as some exist in only a single impression, no collection is complete. The degree to which these collections are displayed to the public, or can easily be viewed by them in the print room, varies greatly.

Influence and recognition

Rembrandt is one of the most famous and the best expertly researched visual artists in history. His life and art have long attracted the attention of interdisciplinary scholarship such as art history, socio-political history, education, humanities, philosophy and aesthetics, psychology, sociology, literary studies, anatomy, medicine, religious studies, theology, Jewish studies, Oriental studies (Asian studies), global studies, and art market research. He has been the subject of a vast amount of literature in genres of both fiction and nonfiction. Research and scholarship related to Rembrandt is an academic field in its own right with many notable connoisseurs and scholars and has been very dynamic since the Dutch Golden Age.

According to art historian and Rembrandt scholar Stephanie Dickey: [Rembrandt] earned international renown as a painter, printmaker, teacher, and art collector while never leaving the Dutch Republic. In his home city of Leiden and in Amsterdam, where he worked for nearly forty years, he mentored generations of other painters and produced a body of work that has never ceased to attract admiration, critique, and interpretation. (...) Rembrandt's art is a key component in any study of the Dutch Golden Age, and his membership in the canon of artistic genius is well established but he is also a figure whose significance transcends specialist interest. Literary critics have pondered "Rembrandt" as a "cultural text"; novelists, playwrights, and filmmakers have romanticized his life, and in popular culture, his name has become synonymous with excellence for products and services, ranging from toothpaste to self-help advice.

Francisco Goya, often considered to be among the last of the Old Masters, said, "I have had three masters: Nature, Velázquez, and Rembrandt." ("Yo no he tenido otros maestros que la Naturaleza, Velázquez y Rembrandt.") In the history of the reception and interpretation of Rembrandt's art, it was the significant Rembrandt-inspired 'revivals' or 'rediscoveries' in 18th–19th century France, Germany, and Britain that decisively helped in establishing his lasting fame in subsequent centuries. When a critic referred to Auguste Rodin's busts in the same vein as Rembrandt's portraits, the French sculptor responded: "Compare me with Rembrandt? What sacrilege! With Rembrandt, the colossus of Art! What are you thinking of, my friend! We should prostrate ourselves before Rembrandt and never compare anyone with him!” Vincent van Gogh wrote to his brother Theo (1885), "Rembrandt goes so deep into the mysterious that he says things for which there are no words in any language. It is with justice that they call Rembrandt—magician—that's no easy occupation."

Rembrandt and the Jewish world

Although Rembrandt was not Jewish, he had a considerable influence on many modern Jewish artists, writers and scholars (art critics and art historians in particular). The German-Jewish painter Max Liebermann said, "Whenever I see a Frans Hals, I feel like painting; whenever I see a Rembrandt, I feel like giving up." Marc Chagall wrote in 1922, "Neither Imperial Russia, nor the Russia of the Soviets needs me. They don't understand me. I am a stranger to them," and he added, "I'm certain Rembrandt loves me."

Criticism of Rembrandt

Rembrandt has also been one of the most controversial (visual) artists in history. Several of Rembrandt's notable critics include Constantijn Huygens, Joachim von Sandrart, Andries Pels (who called Rembrandt "the first heretic in the art of painting"), Samuel van Hoogstraten, Arnold Houbraken, Filippo Baldinucci, Gerard de Lairesse, Roger de Piles, John Ruskin, and Eugène Fromentin.

In popular culture

While shooting The Warrens of Virginia (1915), Cecil B. DeMille had experimented with lighting instruments borrowed from a Los Angeles opera house. When business partner Sam Goldwyn saw a scene in which only half an actor's face was illuminated, he feared the exhibitors would pay only half the price for the picture. DeMille remonstrated that it was Rembrandt lighting. "Sam's reply was jubilant with relief," recalled DeMille. "For Rembrandt lighting the exhibitors would pay double!"

Works about Rembrandt

Literary works (e.g. poetry and fiction)
 To the Picture of Rembrandt, a Russian-language poem by Mikhail Lermontov, 1830
 Gaspard de la nuit: Fantaisies à la manière de Rembrandt et de Callot, a series of French-language poems by Aloysius Bertrand, 1842
 Picture This, a novel by Joseph Heller, 1988
 Moi, la Putain de Rembrandt, a French-language novel by Sylvie Matton, 1998
 Van Rijn, a novel by Sarah Emily Miano, 2006
 I Am Rembrandt's Daughter, a novel by Lynn Cullen, 2007
 The Rembrandt Affair, a novel by Daniel Silva, 2011
 The Anatomy Lesson, a novel by Nina Siegal, 2014
 Rembrandt's Mirror, a novel by Kim Devereux, 2015

Films
 The Stolen Rembrandt, a 1914 film directed by Leo D. Maloney and J. P. McGowan
 The Tragedy of a Great / Die Tragödie eines Großen, a 1920 film directed by Arthur Günsburg
 The Missing Rembrandt, a 1932 film directed by Leslie S. Hiscott
 Rembrandt, a 1936 film directed by Alexander Korda
 Rembrandt, a 1940 film
 Rembrandt in de schuilkelder / Rembrandt in the Bunker, a 1941 film directed by Gerard Rutten
 Rembrandt, a 1942 film directed by Hans Steinhoff
 Rembrandt: A Self-Portrait, a 1954 documentary film by Morrie Roizman
 Rembrandt, schilder van de mens / Rembrandt, Painter of Man, a 1957 film directed by Bert Haanstra
 Rembrandt fecit 1669, a 1977 film directed by Jos Stelling
 Rembrandt: The Public Eye and the Private Gaze, a 1992 documentary film by Simon Schama
 Rembrandt, a 1999 film directed by Charles Matton
 , a 1999 film directed by David Devine
 Stealing Rembrandt, a 2003 film directed by Jannik Johansen and Anders Thomas Jensen
 Simon Schama's Power of Art: Rembrandt, a 2006 BBC documentary film series by Simon Schama
 Nightwatching, a 2007 film directed by Peter Greenaway
 Rembrandt's J'Accuse, a 2008 documentary film by Peter Greenaway
 , a 2011 film directed by Marleen Gorris
 Schama on Rembrandt: Masterpieces of the Late Years, a 2014 documentary film by Simon Schama
 Rembrandt: From the National Gallery, London and Rijksmuseum, Amsterdam, a 2014 documentary film by Exhibition on Screen

Selected works

 The Stoning of Saint Stephen (1625) – Musée des Beaux-Arts, Lyon
 Andromeda Chained to the Rocks (1630) – Mauritshuis, The Hague
 Jacob de Gheyn III (1632) – Dulwich Picture Gallery, London
 Philosopher in Meditation (1632) – The Louvre, Paris
 The Anatomy Lesson of Dr. Nicolaes Tulp (1632) – Mauritshuis, The Hague
 Artemisia (1634) – oil on canvas, 142 × 152 cm, Museo del Prado, Madrid
 Descent from the Cross (1634) – oil on canvas, 158 × 117 cm, looted from the Landgrave of Hesse-Kassel (or Hesse-Cassel), Germany in 1806, currently Hermitage Museum, St. Petersburg
 Belshazzar's Feast (1635) – National Gallery, London
 The Prodigal Son in the Tavern (c. 1635) – oil on canvas, 161 × 131 cm Gemäldegalerie Alte Meister, Dresden
 Danaë (1636 – c. 1643) – Hermitage Museum, St. Petersburg
 The Scholar at the Lectern (1641) – Royal Castle in Warsaw, Warsaw
 The Girl in a Picture Frame (1641) – Royal Castle, Warsaw
 The Night Watch, formally The Militia Company of Captain Frans Banning Cocq (1642) – Rijksmuseum, Amsterdam
 Christ Healing the Sick (etching c. 1643, also known as the Hundred Guilder Print), nicknamed for the huge sum paid for it
 Boaz and Ruth (1643) aka The Old Rabbi or Old Man – Woburn Abbey/Gemaldegalerie, Berlin
 The Mill (1645/48) – National Gallery of Art, Washington, D.C.
 Old Man with a Gold Chain ("Old Man with a Black Hat and Gorget") (c. 1631) Art Institute of Chicago
 Susanna and the Elders (1647) – oil on panel, 76 × 91 cm, Gemäldegalerie, Berlin
 Head of Christ (c. 1648–56) – The Philadelphia Museum of Art
 Aristotle Contemplating a Bust of Homer (1653) – Metropolitan Museum of Art, New York
 Bathsheba at Her Bath (1654) – The Louvre, Paris
 Christ Presented to the People (Ecce Homo) (1655) – Drypoint, Birmingham Museum of Art
 Selfportrait (1658) – Frick Collection, New York
 The Three Crosses (1660) Etching, fourth state
 Ahasuerus and Haman at the Feast of Esther (1660) – Pushkin Museum, Moscow
 The Conspiracy of Claudius Civilis (1661) – Nationalmuseum, Stockholm (Claudius Civilis led a Dutch revolt against the Romans) (most of the cut up painting is lost, only the central part still exists)
 Portrait of Dirck van Os (1662) – Joslyn Art Museum, Omaha, Nebraska
 Syndics of the Drapers' Guild (Dutch De Staalmeesters, 1662) – Rijksmuseum, Amsterdam
 The Jewish Bride (1665) – Rijksmuseum, Amsterdam
 Haman before Esther (1665) – National Museum of Art of Romania, Bucharest
 The Entombment Sketch (c. 1639, reworked c. 1654) – oil on oak panel, Hunterian Museum and Art Gallery, Glasgow
 Saul and David (c. 1660–1665) – Mauritshuis, The Hague
 Portrait of an Old Man (1645) – Calouste Gulbenkian Museum, Lisbon
 Pallas Athena (c.1657) – Calouste Gulbenkian Museum, Lisbon

Exhibitions

 Sept–Oct 1898: Rembrandt Tentoonstelling (Rembrandt Exhibition), Stedelijk Museum, Amsterdam, The Netherlands.
 Jan–Feb 1899: Rembrandt Tentoonstelling (Rembrandt Exhibition), Royal Academy, London, England.
 21 April 2011 – 18 July 2011: Rembrandt and the Face of Jesus, Musée du Louvre.
 16 September 2013 – 14 November 2013: Rembrandt: The Consummate Etcher, Syracuse University Art Galleries.
 19 May 2014 – 27 June 2014: From Rembrandt to Rosenquist: Works on Paper from the NAC's Permanent Collection, National Arts Club.
 19 October 2014 – 4 January 2015: Rembrandt, Rubens, Gainsborough and the Golden Age of Painting in Europe, Jule Collins Smith Museum of Art.
 15 October 2014 – 18 January 2015: Rembrandt: The Late Works, The National Gallery, London.
 12 February 2015 – 17 May 2015: Late Rembrandt, The Rijksmuseum, Amsterdam.
 16 September 2018 – 6 January 2019: Rembrandt – Painter as Printmaker, Denver Art Museum, Denver.
 24 Aug 2019 – 1 December 2019: Leiden circa 1630: Rembrandt Emerges, Agnes Etherington Art Centre, Kingston, Ontario.
 4 October 2019 – 2 February 2020: Rembrandt's Light, Dulwich Picture Gallery, London.
 18 February 2020 – 30 August 2020: Rembrandt and Amsterdam portraiture, 1590–1670 , Museo Nacional Thyssen-Bornemisza, Madrid.
 10 August 2020 – 1 November 2020: Young Rembrandt, Ashmolean Museum, Oxford.

Paintings

Self-portraits

Other paintings

Drawings and etchings
 Rembrandt drawings at the Albertina

Notes

References

Works cited 

 Ackley, Clifford, et al., Rembrandt's Journey, Museum of Fine Arts, Boston, 2004. 
 
 Bomford, D. et al., Art in the making: Rembrandt, New edition, Yale University Press, 2006
 Bull, Duncan, et al., Rembrandt-Caravaggio, Rijksmuseum, 2006.
 Buvelot, Quentin, White, Christopher (eds), Rembrandt by himself, 1999, National Gallery
 
 Clark, Kenneth, An Introduction to Rembrandt, 1978, London, John Murray/Readers Union, 1978
 
 Driessen, Christoph, Rembrandts vrouwen, Bert Bakker, Amsterdam, 2012. 
 
 Gombrich, E.H., The Story of Art, Phaidon, 1995. 
 
 The Complete Etchings of Rembrandt Reproduced in Original Size, Gary Schwartz (editor). New York: Dover, 1988. 
 Slive, Seymour, Dutch Painting, 1600–1800, Yale UP, 1995, 
 van de Wetering, Ernst in Rembrandt by himself, 1999 National Gallery, London/Mauritshuis, The Hague, 
 van de Wetering, Ernst, Rembrandt: The Painter at Work, Amsterdam University Press, 2000. 
 White, Christopher, The Late Etchings of Rembrandt, 1999, British Museum/Lund Humphries, London

Further reading

 Catalogue raisonné: Stichting Foundation Rembrandt Research Project:
 A Corpus of Rembrandt Paintings – Volume I, which deals with works from Rembrandt's early years in Leiden (1629–1631), 1982
 A Corpus of Rembrandt Paintings – Volume II: 1631–1634. Bruyn, J., Haak, B. (et al.), Band 2, 1986, 
 A Corpus of Rembrandt Paintings – Volume III, 1635–1642. Bruyn, J., Haak, B., Levie, S.H., van Thiel, P.J.J., van de Wetering, E. (Ed. Hrsg.), Band 3, 1990, 
 A Corpus of Rembrandt Paintings – Volume IV. Ernst van de Wetering, Karin Groen et al. Springer, Dordrecht, the Netherlands. . p. 692. (Self-Portraits)
 Rembrandt. Images and metaphors, Christian and Astrid Tümpel (editors), Haus Books London 2006

External links

 A biography of the artist Rembrandt Harmensz. van Rijn from the National Gallery, London
 Works and literature on Rembrandt from Pubhist.com
 The Drawings of Rembrandt: a revision of Otto Benesch's catalogue raisonné by Martin Royalton-Kisch (in progress)
 Rembrandt's house in Amsterdam Site of the Rembrandt House Museum in Amsterdam, with images of many of his etchings
 
 
 Rembrandt van Rijn, General Resources
 The transparent connoisseur 3: the 30 million pound question by Gary Schwartz 
 Rembrandt
 The Rembrandt Database research data on the paintings, including the full contents of the first volumes of A Corpus of Rembrandt Paintings by the Rembrandt Research Project
 Die Urkunden über Rembrandt by C. Hofstede de Groot (1906).

 
1606 births
1669 deaths
Art collectors from Amsterdam
Artists from Leiden
Dutch art dealers
Dutch Christians
Dutch draughtsmen
Dutch etchers
Dutch Golden Age painters
Dutch Golden Age printmakers
Dutch male painters
Dutch portrait painters
Dutch printmakers
Engravers from Amsterdam
Leiden University alumni
Painters from Amsterdam
People celebrated in the Lutheran liturgical calendar